"Serotonin" is a song by Norwegian indie rock singer-songwriter Girl in Red, released as a single on 3 March 2021 from her debut studio album If I Could Make It Go Quiet (2021).

Background
Ulven produced the song with Finneas and Matias Tellez. She explained that "Serotonin" is for solving "self-destructive tendencies and mental health struggles through a more expansive soundscape".

Critical reception
Layla Halabian of Nylon felt the song is "a genuine approach to dealing with, well, life, complete with an anthemic hook that make the low points seem a little more bearable."

Music video
The music video was released 29 April 2021. According to a description by Daniel Peters of NME, it features "old home video montage, with Ulven running through fields and riding a car down a highway with red balloons", and the parts of climax is Ulven "flying through a fantastical sequence of a sunrise, Egyptian pyramids, and the default Windows XP wallpaper."

Live performance
In early May 2021, Ulven made her debut on US television, performing the song at The Tonight Show Starring Jimmy Fallon.

Charts

Weekly charts

Year-end charts

Release history

References

2021 singles
2021 songs
Girl in Red songs
Song recordings produced by Finneas O'Connell
Songs written by Girl in Red
Songs written by Finneas O'Connell